The Anthony–Corwin Farm is a historic farmhouse located at 244 West Mill Road near Long Valley in Washington Township, Morris County, New Jersey. It was added to the National Register of Historic Places on May 1, 1992, for its significance in architecture. The  farm overlooks the valley formed by the South Branch Raritan River. The farmhouse is part of the Stone Houses and Outbuildings in Washington Township Multiple Property Submission (MPS).

History
In the 1840s, Jacob Anthony (1794–1863) owned the farm and likely built the stone farmhouse with Greek Revival style. It remained in the Anthony family until 1934 when it was sold to Grace Louise Corwin. The farmhouse was then remodeled  with Colonial Revival style.

Description
The main block of the farmhouse is a two-story stone building with a gable roof. On the east is a one-story frame kitchen wing added . The property has four contributing buildings, including the main house, a barn and wagon house.

Gallery

See also
 National Register of Historic Places listings in Morris County, New Jersey
 German Valley Historic District

References

External links
 

Washington Township, Morris County, New Jersey
National Register of Historic Places in Morris County, New Jersey
Houses on the National Register of Historic Places in New Jersey
New Jersey Register of Historic Places
Houses in Morris County, New Jersey
Stone houses in New Jersey
Colonial Revival architecture in New Jersey
Greek Revival houses in New Jersey
Farmhouses in the United States